Holywell may refer to:

 Holywell, Flintshire, Wales
 Holywell, Swords, Ireland
 Holywell, Bedfordshire, England
 Holywell, Cambridgeshire, England
 Holywell, Cornwall, England
 Holywell, Dorset, England
 Holywell, Eastbourne, East Sussex, England
 Holywell, Gloucestershire, a location in England
 Holywell, Herefordshire, a place in Herefordshire
 Holywell, Hertfordshire, England
 Holywell, Northumberland, in Seaton Valley, England
 Holywell, Lincolnshire, England
 Holywell, Oxfordshire, England
 Holywell, Somerset, a location in England
 Holywell, Warwickshire, a location in England
 Holy Well, Malvern, Worcestershire, England

See also
 Holywell Street (disambiguation)
 Holywells Park, Ipswich, Suffolk, England
 
 Holy well
 East Holywell, a hamlet in Backworth, Tyne and Wear, England
 West Holywell, a hamlet in Backworth, Tyne and Wear, England
 Holly Wells (1991–2002), a victim of the Soham murders
 Hollywell, Queensland, Australia